Thomas Fletcher (born October 1, 1998) is an American football long snapper for the Seattle Sea Dragons of the XFL. He played college football at Alabama, where he won the Patrick Mannelly Award in 2020. Fletcher was drafted by the Carolina Panthers in the sixth round of the 2021 NFL Draft but missed his rookie season due to a hip injury and was waived prior to the 2022 season.

College career 
Fletcher played for University of Alabama from 2017 to 2020. He was a four-year starter playing in 55 games over the course of his college career. While at Alabama, Fletcher won two CFP national championships. He also won the Patrick Mannelly Award as college football's top long snapper in 2020.

Professional career

Carolina Panthers 
Fletcher was drafted by the Carolina Panthers in the sixth round (222nd overall) of the 2021 NFL Draft. He signed his four-year rookie contract on May 13, 2021. He suffered a hip injury prior to the regular season and was placed on injured reserve. He was waived on August 4, 2022.

Seattle Sea Dragons 
On November 17, 2022, Fletcher was drafted by the Seattle Sea Dragons of the XFL.

References

External links
 
 Alabama Crimson Tide profile

Living people
People from Georgetown, Texas
Players of American football from Texas
American football long snappers
IMG Academy alumni
Alabama Crimson Tide football players
Carolina Panthers players
Seattle Sea Dragons players
1998 births